Kamrunnessa Government Girls High School is a public secondary school for girls in Tikatuli, Dhaka.

Location On Google Maps

History
Kamrunnessa Government Girls High School was originally established as a branch of Eden College and it was separated from the college in 1924 and renamed as Kamrunnessa High School. It was named by Nawabzadi Akhtar Banu after her mother, Kamrunnessa. Kamrunnessa was married to  Nawab Sir Khwaja Ahsanullah Bahadur, the Nawab of Dhaka. It was supported by Akhtar Banu and her sisters. Sir Khwaja Nazimuddin, the chief Minister of Bengal, nationalised the school after the Partition of Bengal in 1947. The school became a government school and was moved to 25 Abhoy Das lane, Tikatuli.

Notable alumni
 Kazi Khaleda Khatun, activist
 Bibi Russell, fashion designer and former international model

References

1924 establishments in India
Schools in Dhaka
Girls' schools in Bangladesh
Educational institutions established in 1924